Kuressaare Parish was a rural municipality of Estonia, in Saare County. The parish was formed in 1938. It existed until 1950. The parish was re-established in 1992. In 1999 the parish was merged with Kaarma Parish.

References

Saare County
Former municipalities of Estonia